Kim Yu-kwon (Hangul: , born April 9, 1992), better known by the stage name U-Kwon, is a South Korean singer. He is a vocalist and dancer in Block B; he is also a member of the sub-unit Bastarz along with P.O and B-Bomb, as well as the sub-unit T2u with Taeil.

Biography
U-Kwon was born in Suwon, South Korea.

Career

2011–2016: Career beginnings 

U-Kwon debuted with Block B in April 2011. Four years later, it was announced that U-Kwon would participate in Block B's first sub-unit, Bastarz, along with members P.O and B-Bomb. The group's first album was released on April 13, 2015, and its second on October 31, 2016. In between, U-Kwon, along with B-Bomb, recorded the song "Bingle Bingle" on the Block B album Blooming Period, which was released April 11, 2016. U-Kwon released his first Japanese solo, "Painless", on June 24, 2016; the song was composed by him for the short vampire film Q Chan, in which he starred.

On June 24, 2016, it was announced that U-Kwon had been cast on the idol-dance competition show Hit the Stage. U-Kwon partipated in the show with YooA as his partner. U-Kwon won the premiere episode of the show with a dance routine in which he portrayed the Joker. They ultimately finished fourth.

2017–present: Solo career 
In June 2017, U-Kwon and fellow Block B member P.O received the Maxim K-Model Icon Idol Award.

U-Kwon performed a seven-show, six-city tour of Japan from August 26 to September 7, 2017, along with fellow Block B member Taeil as the special unit T2u. U-Kwon also took part in the Japanese special project album, Block B: Project-1, released September 20, performing the song "Winner" along with P.O and Japanese rapper Chanmina.

On October 18, it was announced that U-Kwon had been selected to host the music show The Power of K, along with Nancy of Momoland and Shownu of Monsta X. The show began broadcasting January 2018 in both Korea and Japan.

In December 2017, U-Kwon along with the singer Rothy released an OST song for the drama Jugglers entitled "Baby Baby."

On January 8, 2018, Block B released the album Re: Montage featuring a solo song by U-Kwon, "Everythin'." In addition to performing the song, U-Kwon helped write the lyrics. U-Kwon also wrote the Japanese lyrics to the 2018 T2u song "Good Bye," which appears on the Block B The Best album, and the Japanese lyrics to the song "Ocean," which appears on the subunit's debut album, T2U.

On August 12, 2022, during Haha's Twitch stream with him, U-Kwon announced that he left KQ Entertainment and is currently working independently before deciding on an entertainment company to join.

Personal life
U-Kwon announced in December 2012 that he was in a relationship with the model Jun Sun-hye. She announced their breakup on May 1, 2022, saying the two remained friends. 

In May 2020, it was announced that U-Kwon would begin the military service required of South Korean men on May 18. U-Kwon was discharged from military service on November 21, 2021 without returning to the unit after his last vacation in accordance with the Ministry of Defense guidelines for preventing the spread of COVID-19.

Discography

Single albums

Soundtrack appearances

Filmography

Variety shows

Dramas

Film

Musicals

References

External links

1992 births
Living people
K-pop singers
South Korean male idols
South Korean pop singers
21st-century South Korean  male singers
Block B members
KQ Entertainment artists